Ming-chin Tsai (born 28 September 1984) is a Taiwanese baseball pitcher who is currently a free agent. He attended the National Taiwan University of Physical Education and Sport and was the second round draft pick of the Sinon Bulls in 2006.

Tsai represented Taiwan at the 2017 World Baseball Classic.

References

1984 births
Living people
2017 World Baseball Classic players
Baseball players from Tainan
Fubon Guardians players
Sinon Bulls players
EDA Rhinos players
National Taiwan University alumni
Fubon Guardians coaches